Bee Nguyen (born July 18, 1981) is an American nonprofit executive and politician serving as a member of the Georgia House of Representatives from the 89th district. A member of the Democratic Party, she was elected during a special election in December 2017 to fill the seat vacated following Stacey Abrams's resignation in August 2017 to focus on her run for governor. Nguyen is the first Vietnamese-American elected to the Georgia House of Representatives.

Early life and education
Born in Ames, Iowa, Nguyen grew up in Augusta, Georgia, and attended Georgia State University for her bachelor's and master's in English literature and an MPA in finance and management. She moved to Atlanta in 1999.

Career 
Nguyen was previously the executive director of a nonprofit organization she founded, Athena Warehouse, a program to educate and empower girls in under-resourced communities. She is currently National Policy Advisor for New American Leaders. In November 2018, BizJournals included her on a list of 40 under 40s. Nguyen described her charitable work as helping to "focus her desire to reduce economic disparity".

Georgia Legislature

Elections 
After Abrams resigned from the state legislature, four candidates announced efforts to succeed her.

In addition to being the first Vietnamese-American to win election to the Georgia House, Nguyen became the first Asian-American Democratic woman to hold a state office in Georgia.

In June 2020, Nguyen won the Democratic nomination for reelection to her seat by a wide margin.

Tenure 
Nguyen opposed the Election Integrity Act of 2021.

2022 Georgia Secretary of State election 

On May 4, 2021, Nguyen declared her candidacy for Georgia Secretary of State in the 2022 election. In February 2022, she announced that she had raised over $1 million in her campaign. Nguyen received 44% of the vote, and advanced to a runoff election against Dee Dawkins-Haigler, who received 19% of the vote. Nguyen defeated Dawkins-Haigler in the runoff. She lost to the incumbent, Brad Raffensperger, in the November 8 general election.

References

|-

1981 births
21st-century American politicians
21st-century American women politicians
American women of Vietnamese descent in politics
Asian-American people in Georgia (U.S. state) politics
Georgia State University alumni
Living people
Democratic Party members of the Georgia House of Representatives
Politicians from Ames, Iowa
Politicians from Atlanta
Women state legislators in Georgia (U.S. state)
Candidates in the 2022 United States elections